The 1993–94 Boston College Eagles men's basketball team represented Boston College as members of the Big East Conference during the 1993–94 NCAA Division I men's basketball season. The team was led by 8th-year head coach Jim O'Brien and played their home games at the Silvio O. Conte Forum in Boston, Massachusetts.

After finishing third in the Big East regular season standings, the Eagles were bounced in the quarterfinal round of the Big East tournament. The early exit in the conference tournament didn't linger, as BC received an at-large bid to the NCAA tournament as No. 9 seed in the East region and made a run to the Elite Eight.

Roster

Schedule and results

|-
!colspan=12 style=| Regular season

|-
!colspan=12 style=| Big East tournament

|-
!colspan=12 style=| NCAA Tournament

Sources

Rankings

NBA draft

References

Boston College Eagles men's basketball seasons
Boston College Eagles
Boston College
Boston Coll
Boston Coll